Grīziņkalns is a neighbourhood of Riga, the capital of Latvia. The Orthodox Holy Trinity Cathedral, Daugava Stadium and the Staburadze confectionery factory (a part of Orkla Latvia) are located in the area, and it is dominated by late-19th century to early-20th century working class housing.

Latvian writer  described the working-class area of Grīziņkalns in his 1928 adventure story Vārnu ielas republika ('Vārnu Street Republic' or 'Crow Street Republic'), which then was used as the premise of the 1970 Soviet Latvian film of the same name.

Grīziņkalns name comes from wealthy merchant Griesen who bought manor here in 1794. However until second half of the 19th century it was a quite secluded place dominated by sandy dunes and meadows. In the second half of 19th century several big factories was opened along newly built Pērnavas street as a result many houses for workers also was built nearby. Since then this area became known as Griesenberg (Grīziņkalns in latvian). Highest spot in the neighbourhood is Grīziņkalns mound, 24 meteres high sand dune. Since 1903 there is public park.

For many years neighbourhood was dominated by working class residents. They were very active during Revolution of 1905 because many of its local leaders lived or worked in Grīziņkalns. Grīziņkalns park was later renamed Park of 1905 there is also monument dedicated to revolution in the park.

Gallery

External links 
History
Staburadze by Orkla

Neighbourhoods in Riga